In mathematics, a character is (most commonly) a special kind of function from a group to a field (such as the complex numbers). There are at least two distinct, but overlapping meanings. Other uses of the word "character" are almost always qualified.

Multiplicative character

A multiplicative character (or linear character, or simply character) on a group G is a group homomorphism from G to the multiplicative group of a field , usually the field of complex numbers.  If G is any group, then the set Ch(G) of these morphisms forms an abelian group under pointwise multiplication.

This group is referred to as the character group of G. Sometimes only unitary characters are considered (thus the image is in the unit circle); other such homomorphisms are then called quasi-characters. Dirichlet characters can be seen as a special case of this definition.

Multiplicative characters are linearly independent, i.e. if  are different characters on a group G then from  it follows that .

Character of a representation

The character   of a representation  of a group G on a finite-dimensional vector space V over a field F is the trace of the representation  , i.e. 

 for 

In general, the trace is not a group homomorphism, nor does the set of traces form a group.  The characters of one-dimensional representations are identical to one-dimensional representations, so the above notion of multiplicative character can be seen as a special case of higher-dimensional characters. The study of representations using characters is called "character theory" and one-dimensional characters are also called "linear characters" within this context.

Alternative definition
For non-abelian groups, the original definition would be more general than this one):

A character  of group  is a group homomorphism  i.e.  for all 

If  is a finite abelian group, the characters play the role of harmonics. For infinite abelian groups, the above would be replaced by  where  is the circle group.

See also
 Character group
Dirichlet character
 Harish-Chandra character
 Hecke character
 Infinitesimal character
 Alternating character
 Characterization (mathematics)
 Pontryagin duality

References

   Lectures Delivered at the University of Notre Dame

External links
 

Representation theory